Syer may refer to:

People
 Henry Syer Cuming (1817–1902), British collector
 John Syer (1815–1885), English painter
 John Syer Bristowe (1827–1895), English physician
 Syer Bars, former member of Roll Deep
 William Syer Bristowe (1901–1979), English arachnologist who wrote under the name W. S. Bristowe

Other
 Syer-Tenyer language, spoken in Burkina Faso

See also
 Syers
 Syre (disambiguation)